The Australian Lightwing SP-4000 Speed is an Australian kit aircraft, designed and produced by Australian Lightwing of Ballina, New South Wales. The aircraft is supplied as a kit for amateur construction.

Design and development
The aircraft was developed from the two-seat SP-2000 Speed and features a cantilever low-wing, a four-seat enclosed cockpit, fixed tricycle landing gear and a single engine in tractor configuration.

The aircraft fuselage is made from welded steel tubing covered in non-structural fibreglass. Its  span wing is built from 6061-T6 aluminum covered in doped aircraft fabric and fibreglass. Standard engines recommended are the  Lycoming O-320 or the  Lycoming O-360 four-stroke powerplants, along with similar Continental Motors, Inc. or auto-conversions. Cockpit access is via gull-winged doors on both sides. Wheel pants are usually fitted.

Specifications (SP-4000 Speed)

References

External links

Homebuilt aircraft
Single-engined tractor aircraft
Australian Lightwing aircraft